Osmanagić is a Bosnian surname. Notable people with the surname include:

 Amer Osmanagić (born 1989), Bosnian footballer
 Semir Osmanagić (born 1960), Bosnian businessman and author

Bosnian surnames
Surnames from given names